"Slip of the Lip" is a song recorded by American heavy metal band Ratt in 1986 from the album Dancing Undercover and is also on their greatest hits album Ratt & Roll 81-91. It was written by Ratt vocalist Stephen Pearcy, bassist Juan Croucier, and guitarist Warren DeMartini.

Music video
In the music video for the song, a female freelance reporter named Kitty Galore (an allusion to Ian Fleming's Pussy Galore character) is sent to a Ratt concert to spy on the band for the fictional "Spy Magazine". Ratt then commences to play at said concert, the music of which compels Kitty Galore to dance along provocatively even while under assignment. The end of the video has Kitty Galore catching a snapshot of Ratt lead vocalist Stephen Pearcy, after which the two suddenly start to make out while Pearcy secretly destroys her roll of film.

The hotel room scenes in the video were filmed in Shreveport, Louisiana following a live concert at the historic Hirsch Memorial Coliseum. The live concert footage of the video was shot January 29, 1987 at the Municipal Auditorium in Nashville, Tennessee. The band played the song twice at that concert.

Personnel
Stephen Pearcy- Vocals
Warren DeMartini- co-lead guitar
Robbin Crosby- co-lead guitar
Juan Croucier- Bass guitar
Bobby Blotzer- Drums

See also
Ratt
Dancing Undercover

References

Ratt songs
1987 singles
Song recordings produced by Beau Hill
Songs written by Stephen Pearcy
Songs written by Juan Croucier
Songs written by Warren DeMartini